Hochschild, Kohn Belvedere and Hess Shoes is a national historic district consisting of a combined department store and shoe store building located at Baltimore, Maryland, United States. It consists of the  two-story plus basement, Hochschild, Kohn Belvedere department store (constructed 1946–1948) and 1948 Hess Shoes store across the street.  The structures comprise the modern-style core of a commercial development at York Road and Belvedere Avenue.  The department store features a rounded corner with a glazed curtain wall facing the prominent intersection.

Hochschild, Kohn Belvedere and Hess Shoes was listed on the National Register of Historic Places in 2003.

References

External links
, including photo from 2002, at Maryland Historical Trust

Buildings and structures in Baltimore
Commercial buildings completed in 1948
Commercial buildings on the National Register of Historic Places in Baltimore
Historic districts in Baltimore
Historic districts on the National Register of Historic Places in Maryland
Mid-Govans, Baltimore
Modernist architecture in Maryland